Girl: The World Tour was the second concert tour by American singer Maren Morris in support of her second major label studio album, Girl (2019). The tour began on March 9, 2019, at Riviera Theatre in Chicago and concluded on November 16, 2019, at The Armory in Minneapolis.

Development
Maren Morris announced the tour on January 17, 2019, a day prior to the release of "Girl". The tour was set to visit North America, Europe and Oceania. Maren also brought out Cassadee Pope & RaeLynn to open for her on select dates. Recently Morris extended the tour by adding music festival appearances and additional dates with Kassi Ashton & Hailey Whitters.

Critical reception
Reviewing the opening show in Chicago, The Early Registration wrote that Morris called "her own shots" and "cooking up own flavor". Dave Paulson of Tennessean described the show as a "pocket-sized arena spectacle". Jeremy Burchard of Taste Of Country stated that Morris found the "strike to balance" between "burgeoning superstar" and "humble songwriter" during her show in Nashville. Katie Boudreau of 303 Magazine praised Morris' stage presence and vocal power, and stated that Morris delivered a "knockout" performance. Reviewing the show in Los Angeles, Chris Willman of Variety noted "Make Out with Me" and "RSVP" performances as "the most theatrical" and "arguably best", called her "the next JoJo".

Set list
The set list is representative of the concert on March 19, 2019. It does not represent all concerts for the duration of the tour.

"Girl"
"The Feels"
"80s Mercedes"
"A Song for Everything"
"Common"
"To Hell & Back"
"All My Favorite People" 
"I Could Use a Love Song"
"Make Out with Me"
"Gold Love"
"Flavor"
"Great Ones"
"Once"
"Rich"
"RSVP"
"The Bones"
"My Church"

Encore
"Shade"
"The Middle"

Notes:
During the show in Nashville, Brandi Carlile joined Morris to perform "Common", Miranda Lambert and Natalie Hemby joined her to perform "Virginia Bluebell" and "I Wish I Was". The trio along with Cassadee Pope also joined her during "My Church". 
During the show in Los Angeles, JoJo joined Morris to perform "Common" and a cover of "Too Little Too Late".
During the European leg of the tour, RaeLynn joined Morris to perform "All My Favorite People".

Tour dates

Notes

References

2019 concert tours